The Yamanner worm is a computer worm written in JavaScript that targeted a vulnerability in the Yahoo! Mail service. Released on June 12, 2006, the worm spread through the Yahoo! system, infecting the systems of those who opened the e-mails and sending the user's address book to a remote server.

External links
Worm wriggles through Yahoo mail flaw
Symantec Advisory

Email worms
Yahoo! Mail
JavaScript